May 9 - Eastern Orthodox Church calendar - May 11

All fixed commemorations below celebrated on May 23 by Orthodox Churches on the Old Calendar.

For May 10th, Orthodox Churches on the Old Calendar commemorate the Saints listed on April 27.

Saints
 Saint Simon the Zealot, Apostle (1st century)
 Martyr Hesychius the Palatine of Antioch (c. 304)
 Saint Isidora the Fool-for-Christ, of Tabennisi, Egypt (c. 365)
 Saint Isidore of Alexandria (Isidore The Simple-Minded) (319-404), Hieromonk and Hospitaller (hospital administrator) (404)
 Venerable Passarion the Presbyter (Passarion of Palestine), Agapius and Philemon (mid-5th century)
 Blessed Thais (Taisia) of Egypt (5th century)
 Saint Laurence of Egypt, monk (6th century)

Pre-Schism Western saints
 Martyrs Calepodius, Palmatius, Simplicius, Felix, Blanda and Companions (c. 222-232)
 Martyrs Alphius, Philadelphus, Cyprian, at Lentini in Sicily (251)
 Martyrs Erasmus, Onesimus, and 14 other martyrs, in Sicily (251)
 Saint Aurelian of Limoges, Disciple of St Martial of Limoges in France (3rd century)
 Martyrs Quartus and Quintus, two citizens of Capua who were condemned and executed in Rome.
 Saint Comgall, founder and abbot of Bangor (602) 
 Saint Cataldus, born in Munster in Ireland, became a monk at Lismore, then Bishop of Taranto; renowned for miracles (7th century)
 Virgin-martyr Solangia (Solange) (880)

Post-Schism Orthodox saints
 Saint Simon of Vladimir and Suzdal (Kiev Caves), Bishop (1226)
 Venerable Laurence, monastic founder at Mt. Pelion in Volos (late 14th century)
 Blessed Simon of Yurievets and Zharki, Fool-for-Christ (1584)
 Saint Eustathios of Crimea (1745-1759), martyred in Theodosia, Crimea (1759)
 Saint Synesius of Irkutsk (1787)

Other commemorations
 The passage of the relics (1087) of St. Nicholas the Wonderworker through the island of Zakynthos, while on their way to Bari.
 Translation of the relics (1670) of the blessed martyr Basil of Mangazea in Siberia (1602)
 "Kiev-Bratskaya" Icon of the Mother of God (1654)
 Repose of Eldress Taisia (Thaisia) of Voronezh (1840)
 Repose of Hieromonk Andrew (Abramius in Schema) of Whitehoof Convent (1902)
 Slaying of Soldier Eugene Rodionov in Chechnya (May 23, 1996)

Icon gallery

Notes

References

Sources
 May 10/23. Orthodox Calendar (PRAVOSLAVIE.RU).
 May 23 / May 10. HOLY TRINITY RUSSIAN ORTHODOX CHURCH (A parish of the Patriarchate of Moscow). 
 Complete List of Saints. Protection of the Mother of God Church (POMOG). 
 Dr. Alexander Roman. May. Calendar of Ukrainian Orthodox Saints (Ukrainian Orthodoxy - Українське Православ'я).
 May 10. Latin Saints of the Orthodox Patriarchate of Rome.
 May 10. The Roman Martyrology.
Greek Sources
 Great Synaxaristes:  10 ΜΑΪΟΥ. ΜΕΓΑΣ ΣΥΝΑΞΑΡΙΣΤΗΣ.
  Συναξαριστής. 10 Μαΐου. ECCLESIA.GR. (H ΕΚΚΛΗΣΙΑ ΤΗΣ ΕΛΛΑΔΟΣ). 
Russian Sources
  23 мая (10 мая). Православная Энциклопедия под редакцией Патриарха Московского и всея Руси Кирилла (электронная версия). (Orthodox Encyclopedia - Pravenc.ru).
  10 мая (ст.ст.) 23 мая 2013 (нов. ст.). Русская Православная Церковь Отдел внешних церковных связей. (DECR).

May in the Eastern Orthodox calendar